Æthelwold of Lindisfarne (died 740) (also spelled Aethelwald, Ethelwold, etc.) was Bishop of Lindisfarne from 721 until 740.

Æthelwold contributed to the production of the Lindisfarne Gospels: he took the raw manuscripts that his predecessor Eadfrith had prepared and had Billfrith bind them so that they could be read easily. Æthelwold was one of the disciples and assistants of St. Cuthbert. He is the last Bishop of Lindisfarne to have been revered as a saint. He is often mistaken with his near contemporary, Æthelwold of Farne.

Citations

References
 Patron Saints Index accessed on August 29, 2007

External links
 
 Catholic Online Saints and Angels

740 deaths
Northumbrian saints
Bishops of Lindisfarne
8th-century English bishops
8th-century Christian saints
Year of birth unknown